David Ward (March 10, 1907 – March 1982) was an American football end in the National Football League for the Boston Redskins.  Born in Wynnewood, Oklahoma, Ward attended Haskell Indian Nations University and the University of New Mexico.

References

1907 births
1982 deaths
People from Wynnewood, Oklahoma
American football wide receivers
New Mexico Lobos football players
Boston Redskins players